Lutz Feld (born 25 July 1967 in Eitorf, Germany) is a German physicist at RWTH Aachen University.

Having studied physics in Bonn, Germany, Prof Lutz Feld wrote his Dissertation at Deutsches Elektronen-Synchrotron (German Electrons Synchrotron) in Hamburg, Germany. After being a Fellow at CERN, Geneva, Switzerland he habilitated in Freiburg (Breisgau), Germany. 
Since 2004, Feld has the title of a professor at RWTH Aachen University with the main research field particle physics.

References

External links
 FeldHomepage < Feld < TWiki
Scientific publications of Lutz Feld on INSPIRE-HEP

Academic staff of RWTH Aachen University
21st-century German physicists
1967 births
Living people
People associated with CERN
University of Hamburg alumni
University of Bonn alumni